The value judgment controversy (German:Werturteilsstreit) is a Methodenstreit, a quarrel in German sociology and economics,  around the question whether the social sciences are a normative obligatory statement in politics and its measures applied in political actions, and whether their measures can be justified scientifically.

The quarrel took place in the years before World War I, between the members of the Verein für Socialpolitik. Main opponents were Max Weber, Werner Sombart and Gustav Schmoller.

The Zweite Werturteilsstreit is the debate between the supporter of the Kritische Theorie and the Kritischer Rationalismus during the 1960s — better known as Positivismusstreit.

References

Further reading 
 Hans Albert and Ernst Topitsch (editor) – Werturteilsstreit –, Darmstadt 1971
 Äußerungen zur Werturteilsdiskussion im Ausschuß des Vereins für Socialpolitik. – printed as manuscript 1913.
 John Dewey – Logik. Die Theorie der Forschung –, 1986 (Published in German 2002 as "Sozialforschung") 
 Christian von Ferber – Der Werturteilsstreit 1909–1959. Versuch einer wissenschaftlichen Interpretation. – In: Ernst Topitsch (editor) – Logik der Sozialwissenschaften. – , Kiepenheuer & Witsch, Köln, 8. Auflage 1972,  or  
 Dirk Kaesler – Einführung in das Studium Max Webers –, München 1979
 Dieter Lindenlaub – Richtungskämpfe im Verein für Socialpolitik. Wissenschaft und Sozialpolitik im Kaiserreich vornehmlich vom Beginn des “Neuen Kurses“ bis zum Ausbruch des Ersten Weltkrieges (1890–1914) –, part I + II., Wiesbaden 1967 (Beihefte zur Vierteljahresschrift für Sozial- und Wirtschaftsgeschichte Nr. 52/53)
 Jürgen Mittelstraß – Werturteilsstreit –, in: Enzyklopädie: Philosophie und Wissenschaftstheorie, 1996 
 Wolfgang Schluchter – Wertfreiheit und Verantwortungsethik –, Tübingen 1971
 Gustav von Schmoller – Die Volkswirtschaft, die Volkswirtschaftslehre und ihre Methode, 1893 (Frankfurt am Main 1949) 
 Verhandlungen des Vereins für Socialpolitik in Wien, 1909 –, Leipzig 1910. (Schriften des Vereins für Socialpolitik, Band 132)
 Max Weber and Johannes F. Winckelmann (editor) – Gesammelte Aufsätze zur Wissenschaftslehre -, Tübingen 1988, 

German words and phrases
Economic controversies
Ideological rivalry
Positivism
Max Weber